Erno Kardos (born 23 July 1979 in Hungary) is a Hungarian retired footballer.

References

Hungarian footballers
Association football midfielders
Association football wingers
1979 births
Living people
Ferencvárosi TC footballers
Bajai LSE footballers
Pécsi MFC players
Győri ETO FC players
Kaposvári Rákóczi FC players
Komlói Bányász SK footballers
Kaposvölgye VSC footballers